Pie-IX station is a Montreal Metro station in the borough of Mercier–Hochelaga-Maisonneuve in Montreal, Quebec, Canada. It is operated by the Société de transport de Montréal (STM) and serves the Green Line. The station opened on June 1976, in time for the 1976 Summer Olympics - as the station serves the Olympic Stadium and the Olympic Park. From 2023, the station will connect to the Pie-IX BRT.

Overview 

The station opened on June 6, 1976, as part of the extension of the Green Line to Honoré-Beaugrand station, in time for the 1976 Summer Olympics. 

Designed by architect Marcel Raby, the station was built in open cut. The centre of the station is taken up with a vast mezzanine bisected by a long ticket barrier. This space, as well as a secondary access to the Angrignon platform, allows the station to handle very large crowds from the Olympic Stadium. The mezzanine gives direct underground city access to the Stadium. The station has two exits of its own, one incorporated into the stadium's parvis, and another across the street.

In 2020, work began to make the station universally accessible at a cost of $81m. The work included the installation of four elevators, widened staircases, as well as extensive station renovation. The project was completed in November 2022, making Pie-IX the Metro's 22nd accessible station.

From 2023, the station will also connect to the new Pie-IX BRT at Pierre-De Coubertin Boulevard. Unlike other BRT stops on Pie-IX Boulevard, the Pierre-De Coubertin stop will be located curb-side for easy access to and from the Metro station.

Artwork 
The station includes four Olympic-themed works of art: three sculptures by the architect Marcel Baby featuring different takes on the Olympic rings, and one long mural in concrete and aluminium by Jordi Bonet entitled Citius, Altius, Fortius ("stronger, higher, faster" - the motto of the Olympic Games).

As part of the work to make the station accessible, an artwork by Francis Montillau will be installed in spring 2023.

Origin of the name
This station is named for Pie-IX Boulevard (pronounced pee neuf). This street was named in 1912 for Pope Pius IX (1792–1878), elected Pope in 1846.

Connecting bus routes

Nearby points of interest

 Olympic Park
 Olympic Stadium
 Biodome
 Rio Tinto Alcan Planetarium
 Montreal Botanical Garden
 Château Dufresne - Musée des arts décoratifs de Montréal
 Collège de Maisonneuve
 Olympic Village
 Saputo Stadium, home of the CF Montréal.

References

External links

 Pie-IX Station - official site
 Montreal by Metro, metrodemontreal.com - photos, information, and trivia
 2011 STM System Map
 Metro Map

Green Line (Montreal Metro)
Mercier–Hochelaga-Maisonneuve
Railway stations in Canada opened in 1976